Marc Hansen (born 10 April 1971) is a Luxembourgish politician. , he serves as Minister for the Civil Service and Minister for Relations with Parliament in the second Bettel–Schneider Ministry.

References 

Living people
1971 births
Place of birth missing (living people)
Luxembourgian politicians
21st-century Luxembourgian politicians
Democratic Party (Luxembourg) politicians